Mary Nazzal-Batayneh (née Nazzal, born 22 August 1979) is a Barrister, social entrepreneur, and impact investor whose career has focused on achieving social justice. Named as one of Forbes magazine's  "Most Powerful Arab Women", she has been recognised for her legal activism, business success, and community impact.
 
Mary is the founder of Landmark Hotels, Jordan's leading local hospitality business. She is the Chairperson of 17 Ventures, an impact investment and advisory firm specialized in innovative finance in MENA.

In 2021, Mary was featured in Entrepreneur Magazine, the piece was entitled "Restoring Hope: Landmark Amman Founder Mary Nazzal Is Doing Her Part To Revitalize Jordan's Business Landscape."

Also in 2021, Mary was featured in Magnitt magazine in a piece covering the Landmark Innovation and Impact Hub co-designed by Endeavour.

In 2019 she was awarded Jordan's "Businesswoman of the Year" by the Jordan Business Awards and in 2014 she was featured in the Forbes Middle East cover story Hospitality Meets Humanity.

She is a Young Global Leader of the World Economic Forum and Global Future Council Member on the Humanitarian Systems Council of World Economic Forum (WEF).

Mary was included in an exclusive exhibit at the United Nations headquarters in New York as part of events to mark the International Day of Solidarity with the Palestinian People, on 29 November 2017.

Early life, education & personal life
Mary was born in Beirut, Lebanon, in 1979 and is the daughter of Yousef Nazzal and Bernadette Bladen-Taylor. Her family left Lebanon during the Civil War and moved to Hampstead, London. Mary was educated at St. Mary's Convent and the American School in London (ASL) and American Community School, Amman Jordan (ACS). Mary has Palestinian-Jordanian, Scottish-Irish, Indian, and Colombian roots. 

Mary completed a BA in political science from Barnard College, Columbia University (magna cum laude), and law degrees from SOAS, University of London, the College of Law London, and the Inns of Court School of Law London. See education section below.

Mary married Aysar Batayneh in 2003, they have 3 children.

Landmark Hotels – Founder
Mary occupied various roles in the hotel business before creating Landmark Hotels, which owns and operates Landmark Amman and until recently the St George Landmark in Occupied East Jerusalem.

Landmark was the first Jordanian hotel to sign up to the UN Global Compact and has introduced various social impact initiatives that prioritise the needs of the local community, including:

-the inclusion of people with disabilities in the workforce making it an equal opportunities employer

-creating The Green Hub by Landmark, an aquaponics dome that promotes soilless technology and saving water as a form of environmental sustainability

-the establishment of Daycare by Landmark, a free on-site daycare for the children of Landmark employees

Landmark also contributes to the SDGs and has partnerships with the United Nations Relief and Works Agency for Palestine Refugees (UNRWA), the United Nations World Food Programme (WFP), the Office of the United Nations High Commissioner for Refugees (UNHCR), and GIZ.

In 2012, the hotel was awarded a Guinness World Record for creating the world's largest falafel. This was part of an effort against cultural appropriation.

17 Ventures
17 Ventures is an impact investment and advisory firm specialized in innovative finance in MENA. In 2020, 17 Ventures co-launched the Jordan Growth and Impact Fund which is structured to deliver financial returns and create sustainable jobs with a focus on women, youth, refugees and people with disabilities.
The fund is investing in Jordanian and Palestinian companies that can grow regionally and internationally while supporting them to become models of sustainable and inclusive business practices.
17 Ventures is playing an active role in defining a legal and operational framework to support social entrepreneurship in the region and is designing a Levant Fund for social enterprises.

Mary is also part of Beyond Capital's angel investor network, and manages a personal portfolio of early stage investments in wellness, F&B, and start ups supporting sustainability.

Board positions and advocacy roles
-Board member of the King Hussein Cancer Foundation and Center

-Board member of INJAZ (an NGO dedicated to preparing young Jordanians to become productive members of their society and succeed in a global economy)

-Board member of the Royal Film Commission of Jordan

-Board member of Al-Shabaka, The Palestinian Policy Network

-An active supporter of the Anti-Apartheid Wall Campaign and organiser of the immersive 2004 Stop the Wall exhibition in Darat al Funun

-Former board member of the Palestine Children's Relief Fund (PCRF)

-Partner and volunteer brand ambassador for the Social Enterprise Project (SEP), which produces high-end fashion accessories by female artists living in the Gaza refugee camp

-Member of the Young Presidents Organization (YPO)

-Member of the Independent Women's Forum (IWF)

Speaker credentials

-Mary spoke at the 2022 Annual World Bank meeting at the session entitled "On the Frontlines of Rising Fragility."

-Mary spoke at the 2019 Middle East and North Africa World Economic Forum (WEF) on how infrastructure can be used to accelerate social impact

-She is a frequent speaker at United Nations events, including for the United Nations Development Programme (UNDP), the Office of the United Nations High Commissioner for Refugees (UNHCR), and the United Nations Relief and Works Agency for Palestine Refugees in the Near East (UNRWA)

-She has spoken at the Harvard Arab Conference on the topic of women in the economy in the Arab world and social enterprise and refugee inclusion

-She is a regular speaker about SDG-aligned businesses and Landmark's mission to fulfil SDG goals to create a more equitable society

-Mary has featured on several high-profile judging panels including The Hult Prize  and the Lazord Foundation.

Education

Mary has a BA in political science from Columbia University ('01), an LLB from the College of Law and an MA in law from SOAS, University of London. She completed her barrister qualification at the Inns of Court School of Law. In 2019, Mary completed Oxford University’s executive programme on transformational leadership, University of Zurich’s executive programme on impact investment and blended finance. In 2020, she completed an impact management and measurement course, accredited by Social Value International. 

Mary has also completed an Executive Education program on Alternative Investments at Harvard Business School and Global Leadership and Public Policy for the 21st Century at the Harvard Kennedy School; Wealth Planning at Columbia Business School and Value Investing also at Columbia Business School.

Other programs completed include: Young Global Leaders Transformative Leadership: Leadership at the Edge at Oxford University and Public Narrative for Women Leaders: Self, Us and Now by Professor Marshall Ganz at Harvard Kennedy School taught by Ahel.

External links
 Restoring Hope: Landmark Amman Founder Mary Nazzal Is Doing Her Part To Revitalize Jordan's Business Landscape
 A landmark for innovation in Jordan | MAGNiTT
 Jordan's Mary Nezzal Batayneh Interview
 #1woman interview – Mary Nazzal-Batayneh
 SEP is proud to present new Brand Ambassador Mary Nazzal-Batayneh and its partnership with Landmark Hotels
 The Good Fight
 Our list of the top 20 Arab activists for 2017
 Mary Nazzal-Batayneh: Legal Movement for Palestinian Rights (2010)
 PART 2 - The legal movement for Palestinian rights.mov
 Go save the whales! (And other ideas for students)
 Exhibit in Amman conveys horrors of Israel's separation wall
 Citizens donate clothes anonymously through 'Wall of Kindness'

1979 births
Living people
Palestinian human rights activists
Barristers and advocates